Sarupathar Assembly constituency is one of the 126 assembly constituencies of Assam Legislative Assembly. Sarupathar forms part of the Kaliabor Lok Sabha constituency.

Members of Legislative Assembly 
 1967: Chatra Gopal Karmakar, Indian National Congress
 1972: Chatra Gopal Karmakar, Indian National Congress
 1978: Aklius Tirkey, Indian National Congress
 1983: Abdul Matlib, Indian National Congress
 1985: Binod Guwala, Independent
 1991: Binod Gowal, Asom Gana Parishad
 1996: Binod Gowal, Asom Gana Parishad
 2001: Aklius Tirkey, Indian National Congress
 2006: Binod Gowal, Asom Gana Parishad
 2011: Aklius Tirkey, Indian National Congress
 2016: Roselina Tirkey, Indian National Congress
 2021: Biswajit Phukan, Bharatiya Janata Party

References

External links 
 

Assembly constituencies of Assam